The Voice of Germany (season 2) is a German reality talent show that premiered on 18 October 2012 on ProSieben and Sat.1. Based on the reality singing competition The Voice of Holland, the series was created by Dutch television producer John de Mol. It is part of an international series. Nick Howard was announced the winner of the season, making him the first winning artist born outside of Germany. This also marks Rea Garvey's first win as a coach.

The first phase: The Blind Auditions

Episode 1: October 18, 2012

Episode 2: October 19, 2012

Episode 3: October 25, 2012

Episode 4: October 26, 2012

Episode 5: November 1, 2012

Episode 6: November 2, 2012

The second phase: The Battle Rounds 

In the battle rounds, candidates from one team are paired off against each other, singing the same song. Only one of the two candidates advances to the next round. Xavier Naidoo and The Boss Hoss had picked up 17 candidates in the blind auditions. Since only 8 candidates from each team can advance, each of these teams has one three-way battle, from which only one candidate will advance to the next round.

 – Battle Winner

Episode 7: November 8, 2012

Episode 8: November 9, 2012

Episode 9: November 15, 2012

Episode 10: November 16, 2012

The third phase: The Live Shows 

In this season, the finalist for each team will be decided in a knock out format. In each duel, the coach and the public have a 50% say in the outcome of each duel. In the final, the public will decide alone.

Episode 11: November 22, 2012

Team BossHoss

Team Nena

Team Rea

Team Xavier

Episode 12: November 23, 2012

Team BossHoss

Team Nena

Team Rea

Team Xavier

Episode 13: November 29, 2012

Team BossHoss

Team Nena

Team Rea

Team Xavier

Episode 14: November 30, 2012

Team BossHoss

Team Nena

Team Rea

Team Xavier

Episode 15: December 7, 2012

Team BossHoss

Team Nena

Team Rea

Team Xavier

Episode 16: December 14, 2012

Each contestant perform his winner's song, a duet with the coach and a celebrity duet.

Winner's songs

Coaches' duet

Celebrity Duet

Elimination Chart

Overall 
Color key
Artist's info

Result details

Ratings

References

External links
 Official website on ProSieben.de
 The Voice of Germany on fernsehserien.de

2012 German television seasons
2